An escarpment is a steep slope or long cliff that forms as a result of faulting or erosion and separates two relatively level areas having different elevations. 

The terms scarp and scarp face are often used interchangeably with escarpment. Some sources differentiate the two terms, with escarpment referring to the margin between two landforms, and scarp referring to a cliff or a steep slope. In this usage an escarpment is a ridge which has a gentle slope on one side and a steep scarp on the other side.

More loosely, the term scarp also describes a zone between a coastal lowland and a continental plateau which shows a marked, abrupt change in elevation caused by coastal erosion at the base of the plateau.

Formation and description
Scarps are generally formed by one of two processes: either by differential erosion of sedimentary rocks, or by movement of the Earth's crust at a geologic fault. The first process is the more common type: the escarpment is a transition from one series of sedimentary rocks to another series of a different age and composition. Escarpments are also frequently formed by faults. When a fault displaces the ground surface so that one side is higher than the other, a fault scarp is created.  This can occur in dip-slip faults, or when a strike-slip fault brings a piece of high ground adjacent to an area of lower ground.

Earth is not the only planet where escarpments occur. They are believed to occur on other planets when the crust contracts, as a result of cooling. On other Solar System bodies such as Mercury, Mars, and the Moon, the Latin term rupes is used for an escarpment.

Erosion
When sedimentary beds are tilted and exposed to the surface, erosion and weathering may occur. Escarpments erode gradually and over geological time. The mélange tendencies of escarpments results in varying contacts between a multitude of rock types. These different rock types weather at different speeds, according to Goldich dissolution series so different stages of deformation can often be seen in the layers where the escarpments have been exposed to the elements.

Significant escarpments

Africa
 Elgeyo escarpment (Great Rift Valley)
 Great Escarpment, Southern Africa
Including the Drakensberg and God's Window in Mpumalanga's Eastern Escarpment
 Bandiagara Escarpment (Mali)
 Zambezi Escarpment (Zambia)
 East coast, Madagascar

Antarctica
 Usas Escarpment

Asia
 Alam-Kuh, Iran
 Sharon Escarpment, Israel
 Tuwaiq, Saudi Arabia
 Vindhya Range, India
 Western Ghats, India
 Wulian Feng, China

Australia and New Zealand
 Australia
 Great Escarpment, Australia
 Darling Scarp
 Dorrigo Plateau
 Illawarra Escarpment
 Lake George Escarpment
 Nullarbor Escarpment
 New Zealand
 The western slope of the Southern Alps (along the Alpine Fault)
 The Kaimai escarpment, above the Hauraki Plains
 The Paekakariki escarpment between Paekakariki and Pukerua Bay (with State Highway 59 and the North Island Main Trunk).

Europe
 England
 Cotswold escarpment
 Chiltern escarpment
 North Downs
 South Downs
 A common placename denominating an escarpment in England is "edge" as in
 Alderley Edge
 Edge Hill famous as the place of the first battle of the English Civil War
 Kinver Edge
 The Lincoln Edge
 Stanage Edge
 Wenlock Edge
 Scotland
 Quiraing, Trotternish, Isle of Skye
 Wales
Eglwyseg
Black Mountain (range)
Black Mountains, Wales
Pen y Fan
France
 La Côte d'Or is famous for its wines and has given its name to a département, Côte-d'Or.
 Le Pays de Bray, a clay vale enclosed by chalk escarpments.
 Sweden, Estonia and Russia
Baltic Klint
Gotland–Saaremaa Klint
South Småland-Sub-Cambrian escarpment
Malta
 Victoria Lines

North America

 Florida Escarpment, Gulf of Mexico
 Sigsbee Escarpment, Gulf of Mexico
 Canada and the United States
 Manitoba Escarpment (Manitoba, Saskatchewan)
 Pembina Escarpment (Manitoba, North Dakota)
 Niagara Escarpment ((east to west) New York, Ontario, Michigan, Wisconsin, and Illinois)
 Eardley Escarpment (Mattawa Fault, Gatineau Park, Quebec)
 Onondaga (geological formation) (Ontario and New York)
 Devil's Rock (Lake Temiskaming, Ontario)
 Scarborough Bluffs (Toronto, Ontario)
 United States
Allegheny Front (West Virginia-Maryland-Pennsylvania)
Blue Ridge Escarpment (North Carolina–Virginia)
Balcones Fault (Texas)
Bergen Hill (New Jersey)
Black River Escarpment (Wisconsin)
Book Cliffs (Colorado–Utah)
Caprock Escarpment (Texas)
Catskill Escarpment (New York)
The Chinese Wall (Montana)
Cody Scarp (Florida)
Devil's Slide (California)
Helderberg Escarpment (New York)
Hell's Half Acre (Wyoming)
Knobstone Escarpment (Indiana)
Lewiston Hill (Idaho-Washington)
Magnesian Escarpment (Wisconsin)
Mescalero Ridge (New Mexico)
Missouri Escarpment (North Dakota)
Mogollon Rim (Arizona)
Muldraugh Hill (Kentucky)
Pine Ridge (Nebraska–South Dakota)
Portage Escarpment (Ohio)
Potrero Hills in (California)
Pottsville Escarpment (Kentucky–Tennessee)
The Rimrocks (Montana)
Sierra Nevada eastern slope (California)
 The Caribbean
 Bahamas Escarpment (Bahamas)

South America
 Brazil
 Great Escarpment, Brazil
 Serra do Mar (São Paulo)
 Serra da Mantiqueira (São Paulo, Minas Gerais and Rio de Janeiro)
 Chile
 West Andean Escarpment

See also
 
 
 List of geological features on Mercury

References

 
Slope landforms